Vrbas is a town and municipality located in the South Bačka District of the autonomous province of Vojvodina, Serbia. As of 2011, the town had a population of 24,112, while the municipality had 42,092 inhabitants.

Name
Its name stems from the word "Willow" in the Serbian language. During the SFRY period, the town was renamed Titov Vrbas (meaning "the Vrbas of Tito"), after Josip Broz Tito. Like all 
other towns in Socialist Yugoslavia named after Tito, the first part was dropped once the new states were formed during the early 1990s.

In Rusyn, the town is known as Вербас, in Hungarian as Verbász, in Croatian as Vrbas, in German as Werbass, and in Turkish as Verbas.

History 

Vrbas was mentioned first in 1213 during the administration of the Kingdom of Hungary. According to other sources, it was mentioned first in 1387. In the 16th century it became a part of the Ottoman Empire. During Ottoman administration it was populated by ethnic Serbs.

Since the Treaty of Passarowitz (1718), Vrbas and the Banat were placed under administration of the Habsburg monarchy. According to the 1720 census, it was populated exclusively by Serbs (about 250 families).

After 1784 many Germans settled in the town founding a new settlement named Novi Vrbas (Neu-Verbasz) near the old Serb settlement, which then became known as Stari Vrbas (Old Vrbas).

In 1910, population of Novi Vrbas was mostly composed of ethnic Germans, while population of Stari Vrbas was ethnically mixed and was mainly composed of Serbs and Germans.

In 1918, Vrbas became part of the Kingdom of Serbs, Croats and Slovenes, which was later renamed to Yugoslavia. The town was under Axis occupation in 1941–1944, and during that time it was attached to Horthy's Hungary. As a consequence of the World War II events in Yugoslavia, the German population fled from the town after this war. At the same time, many settlers from Montenegro came to Vrbas and other neighboring places.

Inhabited places
Vrbas municipality includes the city of Vrbas and the following villages:
 Bačko Dobro Polje
 Zmajevo
 Kosančić
 Kucura
 Ravno Selo
 Savino Selo

Demographics

According to the 2011 census results, the municipality has 42,092 inhabitants.

Ethnic groups

Settlements with Serb ethnic majority are: Bačko Dobro Polje, Zmajevo, Kosančić, Ravno Selo and Vrbas. Ethnically mixed settlements are: Kucura (with relative Rusyn majority) and Savino Selo (with relative Montenegrin majority).

The ethnic composition of the municipality:

Economy
The following table gives a preview of total number of registered people employed in legal entities per their core activity (as of 2018):

Notable citizens 
 Molter Károly, writer (1890–1981)
 Vida Ognjenović, writer and director (b. 1941)
 Desanka Pešut, sports shooter (b. 1941)
 Lazar Ristovski, actor (b. 1952)
 Radoman Božović, politician and former Prime Minister of Serbia (b. 1953)
 Miodrag Kostić, businessman (b. 1959)
 Svetozar Šapurić, footballer (b. 1960)
 Igor Marojević, Serbian writer (b. 1968)
 Milorad Mažić, football referee (b. 1973)
 Magdolna Rúzsa, singer (b. 1985)
 Nikola Komazec, footballer (b. 1987)
 Ljubomir Fejsa, footballer (b. 1988)
 Bianka Buša, volleyball player (b. 1994)
 Maša Janković, basketball player (b. 2000)
 Milos Kerkez, Hungarian football player (b. 2003)

Gallery

See also
 Municipalities of Serbia
 South Bačka District
 Bačka
 List of places in Serbia
 List of cities, towns and villages in Vojvodina

References
 Slobodan Ćurčić, Broj stanovnika Vojvodine, Novi Sad, 1996.

External links

 www.vrbas.net
 Vrbas
 Vrbas

 
Places in Bačka
Populated places in South Bačka District
Municipalities and cities of Vojvodina
Towns in Serbia